Jessie Cannizzaro is an American actress, best known for her roles in the long-running off-Broadway comedy Puffs, or Seven Increasingly Eventful Years at a Certain School of Magic and Magic and the Amazon Studios feature film Selah and the Spades.

Life and career
Cannizzaro was born in New York City, where she was student body president at the Bronx High School of Science. She went on to study Theater and Political Science at Swarthmore College.

In 2015, Cannizzaro originated the role of Sally Perks/Others in the long-running off-Broadway play Puffs, or Seven Increasingly Eventful Years at a Certain School of Magic and Magic, which was filmed and screened in movie theaters nationwide via Fathom Events and later released on Amazon Prime Video, iTunes, and BroadwayHD. She also originated the role of Thalia in two-time Olivier Award-winning playwright Ken Ludwig's The Gods of Comedy, a co-production between McCarter Theatre and Old Globe Theatre. Cannizzaro is also known for her work in the 2019 Sundance Film Festival feature Selah and the Spades and the Nick Jr. children's television series Nella the Princess Knight.

Filmography

Film

Television

Theatre

References

External links 
 
 Jessie Cannizzaro at BroadwayWorld
 Jessie Cannizzaro at Internet Off-Broadway Database

Living people
21st-century American actresses
Actresses from New York City
American television actresses
American film actresses
American stage actresses
Swarthmore College alumni
Year of birth missing (living people)
The Bronx High School of Science alumni